The 1948 United States men's Olympic basketball team competed in the 1948 Summer Olympics, along with 22 other basketball teams. The basketball tournament was held in London, England at Wembley Stadium. Team USA won their second straight gold medal after 1936 (Summer Olympic Games were cancelled in 1940 and 1944, due to World War II). The team was made up of Amateur Athletic Union and college basketball players.

Roster

USA match ups (8–0)

	86      	21
	53		28
	59		57
	66		28
	61		33
	63		28
	71		40
	65		21

Final standings

1.  (8–0)
2.  (5–2)
3.  (7–1)
4.  (5–2)
5.  (5–3)
6.  (4–4)
7.  (4–4)
8.  (3–5)
9.  (6–2)
10.  (4–4)
11.  (5–3)
12.  (4–4)
13.  (4–3)
14.  (2–5)
15.  (4–4)
16.  (3–5)
17.  (4–4)
18.  (5–3)
19.  (2–6)
20.  (0–7)
21.  (2–6)
22.  (0–7)
23.  (0–6)

Team USA
Alex Groza led Team USA with an average of 11.1 points per game. Bud Browning was the head coach, Adolph Rupp was the assistant coach, and Louis Wilke was the manager.

See also
Basketball at the 1948 Summer Olympics

References

External links
 USA Basketball, official site

United States at the Olympic men's basketball tournament
United States
olympic